Shavur Rural District is a rural district (dehestan) in Shavur District, Shush County, Khuzestan Province, Iran. At the 2006 census, its population was 17,578, in 2,695 families.  The rural district has 15 villages.

References 

Rural Districts of Khuzestan Province
Shush County